Bagangan is a common name for a number of fishes from the Philippines in various languages. It may refer to:

 Barbodes clemensi
 Barbodes resimus
 Gerres erythrourus
 Gnathodentex aureolineatus
 Lethrinus harak
 Lethrinus lentjan
 Lethrinus microdon
 Lethrinus miniatus
 Lethrinus nebulosus
 Lethrinus olivaceus
 Pentaprion longimanus

See also
 Baganga, Davao Oriental, Philippines